Comotechna is a moth genus of the family Depressariidae.

Species
 Comotechna corculata Meyrick, 1921
 Comotechna dentifera Meyrick, 1921
 Comotechna ludicra Meyrick, 1920
 Comotechna parmifera Meyrick, 1921
 Comotechna scutulata Meyrick, 1921
 Comotechna semiberbis Meyrick, 1921

References

 
Depressariinae